Valentin Sergeyevich Zorin (February 9 1925, Moscow – April 27 2016, Moscow) was a Soviet and Russian political commentator, journalist, author, screenwriter and television presenter.

Career
Zorin was host of several Soviet television programs that discussed international events and politics. Considered an Americanist, Zorin lived most of his working years in the United States. During his career, he was able to secure exclusive interviews with key world leaders, including Henry Kissinger, John F. Kennedy, Charles de Gaulle, and Margaret Thatcher. For most of the second half of the 20th century until the dissolution of the Soviet Union, he was the main source of information for many Soviet people about life and politics in the United States.

In his latter years, he was a columnist for RIA Novosti and hosted a program on Voice of Russia called "How it looks from Moscow." For his work in the media, he received awards including Honoured Cultural Worker of the RSFSR (1973), Vasilyev Brothers State Prize of the RSFSR (1982) and the USSR State Prize in 1976.

References

External links
Interview of U.S. President Ronald Reagan by Valentin Zorin and Boris Kalyagin on May 20, 1988.
Blog including a collection of columns written by Valentin Zorin from 2011 to 2015.

1925 births
2016 deaths
20th-century Russian male writers
Mass media people from Moscow
Moscow State Institute of International Relations alumni
Academic staff of the Moscow State Institute of International Relations
Recipients of the Order of Honour (Russia)
Recipients of the Order of the Red Banner of Labour
Recipients of the USSR State Prize
Recipients of the Vasilyev Brothers State Prize of the RSFSR
Russian male writers
Russian television presenters
Soviet male writers
Soviet television presenters
Burials in Troyekurovskoye Cemetery